Eriocraniidae is a family of moths restricted to the Holarctic region, with six extant genera. These small, metallic moths are usually day-flying, emerging fairly early in the northern temperate spring. They have a proboscis with which they drink water or sap. The larvae are leaf miners on Fagales, principally the trees birch (Betula) and oak (Quercus), but a few on Salicales and Rosales.

Characteristics
Moths in this family are diurnal, flying in the spring at dawn, and in sunshine, sometimes in swarms around host trees. They sometimes come to light and also rest on twigs and branches. By tapping branches over a beating tray, they fall and remain motionless. The moths are small with a forewing length of 4–7 mm. Forewings marking are shining pale golden or purple and often mottled. The purple moths can be difficult to tell apart with certainty and may require genitalia examination. The female moth has a piercing ovipositor and the almost colourless eggs are laid in the parenchyma of a leaf or in a leaf bud. The white or grey larvae form large blotches in the leaves containing intertwining strands of frass. Pupa are decticous in a tough, silken cocoon in the soil.

Etymology
Eriocrania means woolly-headed, from the Greek, erion – wool and kranion – upper part of the head.

References

External link
 Tree of Life 
 Generic Names and their Type-species
 British moth Leaf Mines
 Watson, L., and Dallwitz, M.J. 2003 onwards. British insects: the families of Lepidoptera. Version: 29 December 2011 Detailed description and figures including wing venation. 

 
Moth families
Leaf miners
Taxa named by Hans Rebel